Enrico Dandolo was the second of two  turret ships built for the Italian Regia Marina (Royal Navy) in the 1870s. They were fitted with the largest guns available,  rifled, muzzle-loading guns, and were the largest, fastest and most powerful ships of their day. Enrico Dandolo was built in La Spezia, with her keel laid in January 1873 and her hull launched in July 1878. Construction was finally completed in April 1882 when the ship, named for the 41st Doge of Venice, was commissioned into the Italian fleet.

Enrico Dandolo spent much of her career in the Active Squadron of the Italian fleet, primarily occupied with training exercises. She was heavily modernized in 1895–1898, receiving a new battery of fast-firing  guns in place of the old 17.72 in guns. The ship served in the Reserve Squadron after 1905, and then became a gunnery training ship. During the Italo-Turkish War of 1911–1912, Enrico Dandolo was among the few ships of the Italian fleet to see no action. She was employed as a harbor defense ship, first in Tobruk, Libya in 1913 and then in Brindisi and Venice during World War I. The ship was ultimately broken up for scrap in 1920.

Design

The s were designed by the noted Italian naval architect Benedetto Brin; they were revolutionary warships at the time they were designed, being the first ironclad battleships to be built without a sailing rig, and they marked the beginning of a trend toward larger and larger guns.

The ship's hull featured a straight stem and stern, along with a pronounced ram bow below the waterline. Enrico Dandolo had a minimal superstructure, which included a small conning tower that was connected via a hurricane deck to a heavy military mast located amidships and another small platform further aft. She had a crew of 420 officers and men, which later increased to 515. 

Her propulsion system consisted of two vertical compound steam engines each driving a single screw propeller. Steam was supplied by eight coal-fired, rectangular boilers that were divided into two boiler rooms on either end of the ship's central battery, each vented through its own funnel, which were incorporated into the ends of the hurricane deck.

Enrico Dandolo was armed with a main battery of four  20-caliber guns, mounted in two turrets placed en echelon amidships. This arrangement gave all four guns very wide fields of fire. These were the largest naval guns in use by any country at the time. As was customary for capital ships of the period, she carried three  torpedo tubes.

The ship's bow and stern were not armored, but they were extensively subdivided into a cellular "raft" that was intended to reduce the risk of flooding.

Service history

Construction – 1894

Enrico Dandolo, named after Enrico Dandolo, the 41st Doge of Venice, was laid down at La Spezia on 6 January 1873 and was launched on 10 July 1878. Fitting-out work was completed on 11 April 1882. During the annual fleet maneuvers held in 1885, Enrico Dandolo served as the flagship of the 1st Division of the "Western Squadron", with Vice Admiral Martini commanding. She was joined by her sister , the protected cruiser , and a sloop. The "Western Squadron" attacked the defending "Eastern Squadron", simulating a Franco-Italian conflict, with operations conducted off Sardinia.

The first half of the maneuvers tested the ability to attack and defend the Strait of Messina, and concluded in time for a fleet review by King Umberto I on the 21st. The second phase consisted of joint maneuvers with the Italian Army; the fleet was tasked with attempting to force an amphibious landing, which it effected at San Vicenzo on 30 July, the last day of the exercises.

The maneuvers consisted of close-order drills and a simulated attack on and defense of La Spezia. The ship served as the flagship of the 3rd Division of the Active Squadron during the 1893 fleet maneuvers, along with Affondatore, the torpedo cruiser , and four torpedo boats. During the maneuvers, which lasted from 6 August to 5 September, the ships of the Active Squadron simulated a French attack on the Italian fleet. For the rest of the year, Enrico Dandolo was assigned to the 2nd Division of the Italian fleet, along with the protected cruiser  and the torpedo cruiser .

1895–1920

She was thoroughly reconstructed between 1895 and 1898 to a design created by Inspector Engineer Giacinto Pulino. The ship's old, slow-firing 17.7 in guns were replaced with new  guns, and she received a new secondary battery to defend the ship against torpedo boats. The battery consisted of five  40-caliber guns, sixteen  43-caliber quick-firing guns, eight  20-caliber revolver cannon, and four machine guns. Enrico Dandolo also received a new engine, though her performance remained the same. The ship's crew increased to 495.

She remained in service in the Active Squadron the following year, with Andrea Doria, Francesco Morosini, the three s, and the new pre-dreadnought battleship . In 1905, Enrico Dandolo was transferred to the Reserve Squadron, along with the three s and the three Re Umbertos, three cruisers, and sixteen torpedo boats. This squadron only entered active service for two months of the year for training maneuvers, and the rest of the year was spent with reduced crews. She thereafter served in the Gunnery School as a training ship, along with the torpedo cruiser .

At the start of the Italo-Turkish War of 1911–1912, Italia was assigned to the 5th Division of the Italian fleet, the ironclads Italia and Lepanto, but she saw no action during the conflict. She became the guardship at Tobruk, Libya in 1913 and was transferred to Brindisi and Venice during World War I. While stationed at Brindisi, six of her 37 mm guns were removed. She was stricken on 23 January 1920 and later broken up for scrap.

Notes

References

External links
 Enrico Dandolo (1878) Marina Militare website

Caio Duilio-class battleships
Ships built in La Spezia
1878 ships